BC CSU Sibiu is a Romanian professional basketball club, based in Sibiu, Romania. The club competes in the Liga Națională, winning the championship in 1995 and 1999. The home arena is Transilvania Hall, a 1850-seat arena in Sibiu.

History
In the 2017–18 season, Sibiu made its European debut in the FIBA Europe Cup. In the first qualifying round, it was eliminated by Pardubice, losing both legs.

Trophies
Liga Națională
Champions (2): 1995, 1999
Runners-up (1): 2018–19
Romanian Cup
Champions (1): 2019

Season by season

Logos

Current roster

Notable players
To appear in this section a player must have either:
- Set a club record or won an individual award as a professional player.
- Played at least one official international match for his senior national team.

References

External links
Official Website
Official website of Sibiu fans
Team profile on BaschetRomania
Eurobasket.com CSU Sibiu Page

Sibiu
Sport in Sibiu County
Basketball teams in Romania
Basketball teams established in 1971
1971 establishments in Romania